Rhoda Chileshe (born 8 May 1998) is a Zambian footballer who plays as a defender for Indeni Roses and the Zambia women's national team.

References

1998 births
Living people
Women's association football defenders
Zambian women's footballers
Zambia women's international footballers